Spatial Cultural-Historical Units of Great Importance (/) are the monuments in Serbia that have the second level of the State protection.

Those are part of the Cultural Property of Great Importance protection list.

References

Further reading 
 Просторне културно-историjске целине at www.spomenicikulture.mi.sanu.ac.rs

See also 
 Cultural Property of Great Importance
 Serbian culture

Monuments and memorials in Serbia
 
Cultural heritage of Serbia

sr:Списак споменика културе од изузетног значаја